The Royal Albert Bridge is a railway bridge which spans the River Tamar in England between Plymouth, Devon and Saltash, Cornwall. It carries the Cornish Main Line railway in and out of Cornwall. It is adjacent to the Tamar Bridge which opened in 1962 to carry the A38 road.

The Royal Albert Bridge was designed by Isambard Kingdom Brunel. Surveying started in 1848 and construction commenced in 1854. The first main span was positioned in 1857 and the completed bridge was opened by Prince Albert on 2 May 1859. Brunel died later that year and his name was then placed above the portals at either end of the bridge as a memorial. During the 20th century the approach spans were replaced, and the main spans strengthened. It has attracted sightseers since its construction and has appeared in many paintings, photographs, guidebooks, postage stamps and on the UK £2 coin. Anniversary celebrations took place in 1959 and 2009.

Cornwall Railway
Two rival schemes for a railway to Falmouth, Cornwall, were proposed in the 1830s. The 'central' scheme was a route from Exeter around the north of Dartmoor, an easy route to construct but with little intermediate traffic. The other, the 'coastal' scheme, was a line with many engineering difficulties but which could serve the important naval town of Devonport and the industrial area around St Austell. The central scheme was backed by the London and South Western Railway while the coastal scheme was promoted by the Cornwall Railway and backed by the Great Western Railway which wanted it to join up with the South Devon Railway at Devonport. The Cornwall Railway applied for an Act of Parliament in 1845 but it was rejected, in part because of William Moorsom's plan to carry trains across the water of the Hamoaze on the Devonport-to-Torpoint Ferry. Following this Isambard Kingdom Brunel took over as engineer and proposed to cross the water higher upstream using a bridge at Saltash instead. The Act enabling this scheme was passed on 3 August 1846.

Design

The structure was the third in a series of three large wrought iron bridges built in the middle of the 19th century. It was influenced by the preceding two, both of which had been designed by Robert Stephenson. The two central sections of Brunel's bridge are novel adaptations of the design Stephenson employed for the High Level Bridge across the River Tyne in Newcastle Upon Tyne in 1849. Brunel was present when Stephenson raised the girders of his Britannia Bridge across the Menai Strait in the same year.

The Admiralty again rejected this plan, stipulating that there should not be more than one pier in the navigable part of the river.

Brunel now abandoned plans for a double track timber structure and instead proposed a single track wrought iron design consisting of a single  span.

The two spans are lenticular trusses with the top chord of each truss comprising a heavy tubular arch in compression, which tend to expand in length under load, while the bottom chord comprises a pair of chains, which tend to contract in length under load. By design, these two effects cancel so that there is no net change in length under load. This in turn enables each of the trusses to be supported with no horizontal thrust exerted on the piers, which is crucial in view of the curved track on either side. Between these two chords are supporting cross-bracing members and suspension standards which hang beneath the bottom chord to carry the railway deck which is a continuous plate beam. There are also 17 shorter and more conventional plate-girder approach spans on the shore.

History

Construction

The first work was to properly survey the river bed. From the bottom of this the bed of the river could be examined to identify its nature and the location of solid foundations. The Cornwall Railway at this time was finding it difficult to raise funds and so most operations were suspended that summer, but a small fund was allowed for Brunel to continue the survey. The cylinder was positioned at 35 different places and a total of 175 borings made.

In 1853 the tenders for the bridge were considered by the Cornwall Railway Board, and it was decided to let the work to Charles John Mare, a shipbuilder from Blackwall who had built the ironwork for the Britannia Bridge. The fee he sought for building the Saltash Bridge was £162,000, but on 21 September 1855 while constructing the first of the two trusses he filed for bankruptcy. Brunel proposed that the company should complete this first truss itself by its own direct labour, to which the company agreed. A contract for the remainder of the building was awarded to Messrs Hudson and Male.

Mare's first task had been to establish an erecting yard on the Devon shore with a jetty and workshops. This was launched in May 1854 and moored in the centre of the river between four pontoons. The bottom had been shaped to follow the rock surveyed in 1848. Once it was settled on the river bed the water was pumped out, the mud within it excavated, and a solid masonry pier built up clear of the water. This was completed in November 1856.

The landward piers on the Cornish side of the river were completed in 1854 and the girders for these spans were hoisted up to their correct positions. Next to be built was the main truss for the Cornwall side of the river. The lower ties of the trusses formed of chains made from  links. Many were obtained from the suspended works for Brunel's Clifton Suspension Bridge and others rolled new for Saltash. The Cornwall span was floated into position on 1 September 1857 and jacked up to full height in  stages as the piers were built up beneath it, the central pier using cast iron octagonal columns; the landward one using ordinary masonry.

With the yard now cleared of the first truss, work could start on the main Devon span. This was similarly floated into position on 10 July 1858 and then raised in a similar manner. It was in its final position by 28 December 1858. After this had been removed, part of the yard had to be cleared to allow the construction of the final landward pier and then the Devon approach spans could be raised up to their final position. The work was sufficiently advanced that directors were able to make an inspection by train on 11 April 1859.

The Cornwall span had been tested before it was launched. The two ends were supported on substantial timber piers and the remaining scaffolding removed. Now that it was completed, the bridge had its statutory inspection and tests by Colonel Yolland on behalf of the Board of Trade on 20 April 1859. Overall he described it as 'highly satisfactory'.

Opening day
Prince Albert had agreed to the bridge being named after him as early as 1853. He was invited to perform the opening ceremony, and on 2 May 1859 he travelled from Windsor on the Royal Train. Several thousand spectators attended that day, although guests from Cornwall were late for the ceremony as their train broke down at Liskeard. Illness prevented the attendance of Brunel who was instead represented by his chief assistant Robert Brereton.  Public services commenced on 4 May 1859.

Changes since 1859
After Brunel's premature death on 15 September 1859 the directors of the Cornwall Railway Company decided to make the bridge a memorial to him by adding the words I.K. BRUNEL, ENGINEER, 1859 in large metal letters on either end of the bridge. In 1921, new access platforms were added that obscured the lettering but in 2006 Network Rail relocated the platforms, allowing the name to be clearly seen again. The walkways had previously been temporarily removed in 1959 and the bridge floodlit during its centenary year.

401 new cross-girders were fitted in 1905 to allow heavier locomotives to pass over. In 1908 the two spans nearest Saltash station were replaced with wider ones to accommodate a new track layout. The remaining approach spans were replaced on both sides of the river during 1928 and 1929. During the 1930s new cross-bracing and diagonal sway-bracing were added between the vertical standards to further strengthen the bridge and keep the suspension chains hanging in the correct shape.

The bridge was Grade 1 listed in 1952.

Additional links between the suspensions chains and the decking were added in 1969 to further strengthen the bridge. In 2011 Network Rail began a three-year £10 million refurbishment involving replacing 50,000 bolts and installation of 100 tonnes of new steelwork. The bridge has also been stripped back to the bare metal and repainted in the Goose Grey colour originally applied in 1952.

Viewing the bridge

The bridge can be crossed using a train on the Cornish Main Line which affords far-reaching views of the Tamar. Cruise boats operate between Phoenix Wharf, Plymouth, from Saltash, and Calstock. Main view points are:

Saltash railway station
The Cornish approach spans start right at the platform end. These were replaced in 1908 so that the single line on the bridge could split into two lines before reaching the station.
Saltash Quay
The foreshore at Saltash runs right up to the pier that supports the Cornish end of the main span.  An inscribed stone commemorating the bridge can be found beneath the bridge on the hillside alongside Fore Street.
Tamar Bridge
The road bridge runs parallel to and slightly higher, on the north side.  A toll-free foot and cycle path is on the south side of the road bridge from which it is possible to examine the bridge in detail.  An area of grass beside the motor vehicle toll booths affords a view of the Devon end of the railway bridge.
Saltash Passage, St Budeaux
The Devon piers can be reached from the waterfront at St Budeaux.  The yard where the spans were constructed was situated alongside the bridge at the foot of the road down the hill.

Cultural impact

The construction of such a large and distinctive bridge soon caught the attention of the general public. The launching of the Cornish span in 1857 attracted a crowd of around 20,000, with similar numbers said to have witnessed the launch of the Devonport span and the opening day. During its construction it was photographed many times and after its opening it was the subject for many paintings, including those by Devonport-born artist Alfred Wallis. It has also been the subject of many photographs and postcards.

It was already a feature in guidebooks in the year of its opening: "It is a labour of Hercules, but Mr Brunel has accomplished the feat," proclaimed one, and went on to report in detail the design and construction of the bridge that "for novelty and ingenuity of construction stands unrivalled in the world". More than 100 years later it continues to appear in many travel guides and features. John Betjeman summed up its impact on the traveller:
The general grey slate and back gardens of Plymouth, as seen from the Great Western made the surprise of Saltash Bridge all the more exciting. Up and down stream, grey battleships were moored in the Tamar and its reaches. Hundreds of feet below, the pathetic steam ferry to Saltash from the Devon bank tried to compete with Brunel's mighty bridge.

The bridge has become a symbol of the transition from Devon to Cornwall. In the Great Western Railway's The Cornish Riviera travel guide, SPB Mais regarded it as "an almost magic means of transporting travellers from a county, which, if richer than others, is yet unmistakingly an English county, to a Duchy which is in every respect un-English. You shut your eyes going over the Saltash Bridge only to open them again on a foreign scene".

The bridge is the backdrop of ITV1's The West Country Tonight during the old westcountry region.

Special events

Special occasions have been marked over the years by special events:

1859 – The bridge was opened by Prince Albert two days before the railway was opened to the public. He arrived by special train from Windsor, was shown around the bridge and the works yard, and then left aboard the Royal Yacht.
1959 – Floodlights lit up the bridge during 1959 in celebration of its centenary.
2006 – The 200th anniversary of Isambard Kingdom Brunel's birth was celebrated by Network Rail permanently removing the access ways that covered his name above the portals.
2009 – During the bank holiday weekend of 2–4 May there were many special events to commemorate the 150th anniversary of the opening of the bridge including a guided walk across the bridge and a re-enactment of the opening day.

References

Further reading

External links

The Royal Albert Bridge official website with Live Webcam
A modeller's research into the bridge
 
The Brunel Museum, Rotherhithe, London
 Photographs of the 150th anniversary events including the bridge walk and re-enactment of the opening
Brunel portal
 An investigation of the first decorative scheme

Bridges by Isambard Kingdom Brunel
Brunel truss bridges
Bridges completed in 1859
Railway bridges in Cornwall
Railway bridges in Devon
Buildings and structures in Plymouth, Devon
Grade I listed buildings in Cornwall
Grade I listed buildings in Devon
Grade I listed railway bridges and viaducts
Transport in Plymouth, Devon
River Tamar
Works of Isambard Kingdom Brunel
Industrial archaeological sites in Devon
Industrial archaeological sites in Cornwall